The chestnut-bellied shrew (Sorex ventralis) is a species of mammal in the family Soricidae. It is endemic to Mexico.

References

Endemic mammals of Mexico
Sorex
Taxonomy articles created by Polbot
Mammals described in 1895